Andrés de Vargas (1613–1647) was a Spanish painter.  He was born at Cuenca, and came to Madrid as a young man.  He studied under Francisco Camilo.  He painted religious works for the friaries as well as for private patrons of Madrid.  He painted works for the cathedral and churches of Cuenca.  
He painted a series of frescoes in the Our Lady of the Sagrario by order of the Chapter of Cuenca.  His style was called by Juan Agustín Ceán Bermúdez "feeble," and injurious to his art was Vargas' practice of regulating the quality of his pictures by their price.

Works

Transverberación de Santa Teresa (1644)
Martirio del brasero, later at the Museo de la Trinidad
Ascensión de la Magdalena
San Roque (1663), San Miguel church, Cuenca

Notes

Bibliography
Angulo Íñiguez, Diego, and Pérez Sánchez, Alfonso E. Pintura madrileña del segundo tercio del siglo XVII, 1983, Madrid, Instituto Diego Velázquez, CSIC, .
Palomino, Antonio, An account of the lives and works of the most eminent Spanish painters, sculptors and architects, 1724, first English translation, 1739, p. 86
Palomino, Antonio (1988). El museo pictórico y escala óptica III. El parnaso español pintoresco laureado. Madrid, Aguilar S.A. de Ediciones. .
Pérez Sánchez, Alfonso E. (1992). Baroque Paintings from Spain, 1600–1750 (Pintura barroca en España 1600–1750). Madrid, Ediciones Cátedra. .

17th-century Spanish painters
Spanish male painters
1613 births
1647 deaths
Fresco painters